The Sunchon tunnel massacre was a death march followed by a massacre of American prisoners of war during the UN offensive into North Korea.

The death march began in October 1950 when around 180 prisoners of war who had survived the Tiger Death March  from Seoul to Pyongyang were loaded onto railcars by the Korean People's Army (KPA) and transported deep into North Korea.

The journey is said to have taken four to five days. The climate was very harsh and many of the POWs, who were unprotected and given no food, water, or medical treatment, died during the trip.

The cars unloaded on October 30 at the Sunchon tunnel in Sunchon, South Pyongan where the Americans were told by the North Koreans they would be given food and treatment. They were divided into groups of 40 and marched to the ravine, where the KPA mowed the Americans down en masse with submachine guns. A witness said the prisoners "went around the corner, into this ditch. They [the KPA] said, “Get down; the planes. Get down; the planes. So when we all ducked down some more of them came up on us over a little rice paddy and they just opened up." 68 people were killed out of 138 people who died during the journey. By the time they had been rescued by a South Korean-American rescue mission, there were only 21 survivors, who a ROK detachment safely conveyed along with the dead to Pyongyang, where C-54 Skymasters flew them to Japan.

The massacre was documented by Charles E. Potter in the Subcommittee on Korean War Atrocities.

See also 

 Bloody Gulch massacre
 List of massacres in North Korea

References 

1950 in North Korea
Korean War crimes
Massacres committed by North Korea
Massacres in 1950
Massacres in North Korea
North Korea–United States relations
Prisoner of war massacres
History of South Pyongan Province
United States in the Korean War